or ) is an island in Troms og Finnmark county, Norway. The southern third of the  island is part of Tromsø Municipality while the northern (larger) portion of the island is part of Karlsøy Municipality. There is a regular ferry connection from Bromnes on the eastern end on Rebbensøya to Mikkelvik on the northwestern end of the neighboring island of Ringvassøya.

On Rebbenesøya, there are many mountains that are suitable for tourists who enjoy the outdoors and hiking. There are also about 20 fishing lakes. The uninhabited island nature reserve of Sørfugløya lies off the north-west coast.

The island's school is in Skogvika; it had six students in the 2012/2013 school year. The island also has a convenience store located in Engvika.

History
Twelve Norwegian commandos from Company Linge were attacked by a German minesweeper in Toftefjord on the island of Rebbenesøya on 30 March 1943. The only man who escaped was Jan Baalsrud. Over a period of three months and enduring harsh conditions, he was aided by patriots in escaping to Sweden. A monument to those killed is located in Toftefjord.

Representation in other media
Baalsrud's escape is the subject of the book We Die Alone: A WWII Epic of Escape and Endurance  (1955) by British author David Howarth. This was adapted as a Norwegian film, called Nine Lives (1957), directed by Arne Skouen. It was nominated for an Oscar in 1958 for best Foreign Language Film.
The book Jan Baalsrud and Those Who Saved Him (2001), written by Tore Haug and Astrid Karlsen Scott, also recounted his remarkable survival. A Norwegian film based on the book, The 12th Man (2017), was directed by Harald Zwart. It was released on Netflix in 2020.

See also
List of islands of Norway

References

Karlsøy
Islands of Troms og Finnmark